Arthur William Coolidge (October 13, 1881 – January 23, 1952) was a Massachusetts politician who served multiple positions within the state government.

Early life 
Coolidge was born in Cumberland County, Maine.

Career 
Coolidge worked as a lawyer before becoming a member of the Massachusetts House of Representatives (1937–1940) and of the Massachusetts State Senate (1941–1946). From 1947 to 1949 he was the 56th Lieutenant Governor of Massachusetts. He was the Republican nominee for Governor in 1950.

From 1943 to 1947, Coolidge was head of a legislative commission (popularly known as the Coolidge Commission) to address the future of the Boston Elevated Railway (BERy). The commission proposed a number of suburban extensions – some of which were built over the following four decades – and created the plans to reform the BERy as the Metropolitan Transit Authority, the predecessor of the modern Massachusetts Bay Transportation Authority.

A Unitarian and Freemason, Coolidge served as Grand Master of Masons (1943–1944) and a member of the American Bar Association and Theta Delta Chi. In 1951, he was elected as a member of the Massachusetts Society of the Sons of the American Revolution.

Personal life 
A fourth cousin to President Calvin Coolidge, he had one daughter, Dorothy Coolidge Cox and two sons: Robert Tilton Coolidge (1915–1955) and Arthur William Coolidge II. One of his grandchildren is film director Martha Coolidge.

He was brother of Massachusetts politician Richard B. Coolidge.

Death 
Coolidge died at his home in Boston and is buried in Forest Glen Cemetery in Reading, Massachusetts. The Arthur W. Coolidge Middle School was named in his honor.

See also
 Massachusetts legislature: 1937–1938, 1939, 1941–1942, 1943–1944, 1945–1946

References

External links
Arthur W. Coolidge at the political graveyard
https://web.archive.org/web/20100313213251/http://www.harvardlodge.org/membersofnote.htm

1881 births
1952 deaths
People from Cumberland County, Maine
People from Reading, Massachusetts
Massachusetts lawyers
Republican Party Massachusetts state senators
Presidents of the Massachusetts Senate
Republican Party members of the Massachusetts House of Representatives
Lieutenant Governors of Massachusetts
Coolidge family
20th-century American politicians
20th-century American lawyers